WPHE at 690 AM in Phoenixville, Pennsylvania, U.S. is known as Radio Salvación (Salvation Radio), a Spanish Christian Religion station. Before it was acquired by the Radio Salvación corporation, it was WYIS Radio 7. Radio 7 was divided in Revista Radio Cultural with its main show Tiempo Latino in the mornings and Summer late evenings, produced and hosted by Frantz Santiago-Peretz and Radio Nuevo Horizonte Spanish religious block in the afternoons led by Rev. José Rivera.  Frantz, a Sephardi, provided pastoral care services to the congregation  at Hopewell Mennonite Church in Reading, Pennsylvania from April 3, 2005, until April 3, 2015.

The team of WYIS included Aixa Torregrosa, Rev. José Castro, the Colombian converso journalist Juan Carlos Izquierdo and many other well-known radio personalities. In 1988 the station was sold by its owner, Dr. B. Sam Hart, to Rev. Sarrail Salvá. Mr. Salvá was a well-known religious radio announcer in Radio Redentor of Utuado and Radio Felicidad of Peñuelas, Puerto Rico. WYIS was a radio station with diversity in its programming, including almost a whole day in Portuguese and programs in English, Greek, and Hebrew. Today WPHE is exclusively a Pentecostal radio station, although its leaders were affiliated with the Lancaster Conference of the Mennonite Church U.S.A. They broke from the Conference to form Koinonia, an Anabaptist association of churches in Philadelphia. Salvá and Juan Carlos Izquierdo were well respected leaders in Philadelphia. Sarraíl Salvá resigned as President of WPHE and from his pastoral role at La Familia. His wife Isabel continues serving as the pastor de la Iglesia La Familia. His family left the radio station. Currently, WPHE continues to work with a board of directors.

References

External links
 

PHE
PHE
Radio stations established in 1979
1979 establishments in Pennsylvania
PHE